L.A. Noire, a neo-noir detective video game developed by Team Bondi, focuses on police detective Cole Phelps and his partners as they investigate and solve various crimes. Previously a U.S. Marine Lieutenant in the second World War, Phelps's experiences during the war left him scarred, and inspired him to join the Los Angeles Police Department.

Cole Phelps is the primary playable character of the game. He is accompanied by a number of characters, notably his partners: Ralph Dunn, Stefan Bekowsky, Rusty Galloway, Roy Earle, and Herschel Biggs. Throughout the course of the story, Phelps falls in love with German singer Elsa Lichtmann, with whom he has an extramarital affair. For a small part of the game, the player controls Jack Kelso, an investigator who fought alongside Phelps during the war. Despite the similarities of their past, Phelps and Kelso behave in an antagonistic nature toward each other.

A team at Team Bondi designed the character appearances, and Brendan McNamara was the main writer of their personalities and mannerisms. The team wanted players to connect with the game's characters, and the actors tried to make their performances appear as realistic as possible. The actors' facial mannerisms were recorded with the newly developed MotionScan, while their physical movements were mostly recorded using motion capture technology. The characters received praise from several gaming publications. The acting has also received acclaim, including a nomination at the British Academy Video Games Awards.

Creation and conception 

L.A. Noire has over twenty hours of voice work, and over 400 actors performed for the game. To cast the characters, the team held secretive auditions. Many actors from the television series Mad Men are featured in the game; game writer and director Brendan McNamara explained that this is due to the casting agency, Schiff/Audino, which also casts for Mad Men. When casting actors for the game, the team simply sought "quality actors", as opposed to well-known actors. During their performances, the actors attempted to appear as realistic as possible. Director Michael Uppendahl said, "I try to monitor the performances to make sure we're getting the human element that's going to make it compelling and interesting."

L.A. Noire is notable for being the first game to use the newly developed technology MotionScan, developed by Australian company Depth Analysis. MotionScan is a motion capture technology that records the face of an actor at over 1000 frames per second. This technology is crucial to the game's interrogation mechanic, which requires players to use suspects' facial reactions to questioning to judge whether or not they are lying. The actors' facial performances were recorded using MotionScan, while their physical movements were mostly recorded using motion capture technology.

McNamara felt that the game's technology allows players to connect with the characters in a way that video games have not achieved before. One of his primary goals throughout development was to develop the characters in the game's story. McNamara felt that video game characters generally maintain their traits and personalities from the beginning of a game to the end; with L.A. Noire, he aimed "to go on a personal journey with characters". "What we're adding to the mix is the cinematography of a film and the characterisation and character development of a TV show," said McNamara. He also set out to develop the gameplay "based on human interactions", and to create characters that players care for.

Lead characters

Cole Phelps 

Cole Phelps (Aaron Staton) is the playable character of L.A. Noire. Phelps was a U.S. Marine Lieutenant in the second World War, in which he witnessed many terrible and traumatic events, such as the Battle of Okinawa. He was honourably discharged from the War, later receiving the prestigious Silver Star medal, and joining the Los Angeles Police Department (LAPD). Phelps is initially depicted as a low-ranking police officer in the LAPD, with a background involving traumatic events in the war, which he rarely speaks about. As he solves cases at the Patrol desk, alongside Ralph Dunn, he is depicted as a highly intelligent investigator, and is promoted to the Traffic desk.  Phelps's tenure at the Traffic desk, partnered with Stefan Bekowsky, results in the solving of multiple cases of murder and fraud. Six months later, Phelps is promoted to the Homicide desk and partnered with Rusty Galloway. Together, they investigate various cases that contain similarities to the Black Dahlia murder, arresting numerous suspects. However, Phelps is doubtful that they are arresting the actual murderers; his theories are ultimately proved correct, and they eventually track down and kill the real murderer, unbeknownst to the public.

Promoted to the high-ranking Administrative Vice desk and partnered with Roy Earle, Phelps is tasked with many investigations relating to drugs and murder. It is during his tenure at the Vice desk that he uncovers that many of the officers in the LAPD are corrupt, including Earle. It is also on this desk where Phelps begins an affair with Elsa Lichtmann, which Earle reports to the chief, resulting in Phelps's demotion to the lowly Arson desk. Partnered with Herschel Biggs, Phelps uncovers and  investigates various arsons, before suspecting that the fires are being set by the members of the Suburban Redevelopment Fund, who are prominent practitioners of prestigious professions, to receive insurance money. With help from Jack Kelso, enough evidence is found to support the suspicions, but before they can prove them to the public, they are sidetracked by the kidnapping of Lichtmann. They find her in the River Tunnels, which are rapidly flooding. After helping Lichtmann and Kelso escape the tunnels, Phelps is swept away by the current and dies.

Staton described Phelps as a "war hero ... on a mission to right some wrongs". McNamara described Phelps as "a character with a moral code", but noted that he also has flaws. Staton was convinced to join the project after McNamara showed him the game world, the character of Phelps, and uses of the MotionScan technology. He was particularly intrigued in the "incorporation of the physical performance in a game, combined with some of the stylistic elements and the story". Prior to performing, Staton received a 12-page document that outlined the story, and the history of Phelps. He has said that he received the document as there wasn't enough time to read the 2,200-page script before filming began. He joined the project after the story was written and most of the world was developed. Staton worked on L.A. Noire for about eighteen months in total. He said, "Consecutively I think I worked six months, and then for the next year here and there picking things up, adding, changing and tweaking things". Staton called the MotionScan process "an isolating experience", as he was acting in a room alone. Staton claims that it took about 90 minutes to prepare his hair before filming, due to the precise requirements of the technology, and that he "never wore a single fedora" during production, despite Phelps's appearance. Initially, McNamara was not keen about the casting of Staton, but Rockstar Vice President for Creativity Dan Houser convinced him into agreeing. "[Cole Phelps] is conflicted and has quite a bit of depth and [Staton] is great at conveying those things," said McNamara.

Jack Kelso 

Jack Kelso (Gil McKinney) is the second playable character of L.A. Noire. He was a U.S. Marine in the Second World War, in which he developed a rivalry with Cole Phelps. After the war, Jack became a claims investigator for California Fire and Life Insurance Company. He was approached by Courtney Sheldon, whose stolen Army surplus morphine had been obtained by Mickey Cohen and given to drug addicts, causing them to overdose. Sheldon asked for Jack's help to avoid prison and more deaths. Jack reluctantly helped Sheldon negotiate with Cohen. However, Cohen struck first by sending hit-men to kill off Jack's old unit who were involved in the morphine heist. Jack was later approached by Elsa Lichtmann, who planned to reject an insurance settlement; Elsa expressed her suspicions that Elysian Fields Development were attempting to cover up something that was more than just an accident. Jack began his investigation at the housing development site, where he discovered that the houses were made from inferior materials, and later discovered a connection to the Suburban Redevelopment Fund. Jack also discovered that his own boss was involved, along with Leland Monroe and other influential and political figures. He later discovered that, through Jack, Elsa was helping Phelps. Despite his rivalry with Phelps, Jack promised to continue his investigation.

Jack deduced that Leland Monroe's plan was to burn some of the substandard houses for the insurance money, while other housing developments were built in the intended path of freeways, such that the government would exercise eminent domain and purchase the land at artificially-inflated prices. Shortly afterwards, Jack learned of Elsa's kidnapping. He discovered that the arsonist of the housing developments was a fellow Marine and former flamethrower operator Ira Hogeboom, and that Elsa was likely holed up with Ira in the river tunnels. After being escorted to the river tunnels, Jack and Phelps reached Ira, with Elsa under his protection. Phelps arrived to take Elsa to safety as Jack performed a mercy kill on Ira. Elsa and Jack exit the tunnel, but Phelps was killed by a violent torrent of water. At Phelps's funeral, Elsa stormed off and angrily. Jack asked Phelps's former partner Herschel Biggs to console her; as he left, he made it clear to Jack that Phelps was never Jack's friend, but confirmed that he believed Phelps knew that they were never enemies.

Towards the end of the final desk, players assume control of Kelso, and alternate between him and Phelps; although different in appearance and personality, the characters are controlled identically. When discussing the player character change near the end of the story, from Phelps to Kelso, McNamara explained that the narrative "got to the point where [Phelps] couldn't really do much more, and you have to go outside the realm of being a cop to bend the rules".

Secondary characters

Stefan Bekowsky 
Stefan Bekowsky (Sean McGowan) is the partner of Cole Phelps while on the Traffic Desk. Bekowsky was partnered with Phelps following the latter's promotion from the Patrol department. While their relationship began antagonistically, they soon became close. Bekowsky helped Phelps to investigate and solve many crimes, uncovering acts of conspiracies, fraud and murder. Phelps was later promoted to the Burglary department. Following Phelps's eventual promotion to the Vice desk, Bekowsky was promoted to the Homicide department, and partnered with Rusty Galloway.

When McGowan auditioned for the role of Bekowsky, he felt an instant connection to the character, which made him enthusiastic about the role; McGowan called Bekowsky "a hoot to play". When discussing his character, McGowan felt that Bekowsky was initially jealous of Phelps, but eventually warmed up to him. "Like a good older brother he'll always have his back but will never take shit from him," he said. McGowan describes Bekowsky as "a sarcastic, outspoken cop who loves a good fight and a good joke", stating that "he's a wise crack but he's not a total dick".

Rusty Galloway 
Finbarr "Rusty" Galloway (Michael McGrady) is the partner of Cole Phelps while on the Homicide Desk. Galloway was initially partnered with Floyd Rose, but following Rose's retirement and Phelps's promotion, he was partnered with Phelps. Galloway initially disliked Phelps, treating him with arrogance, but became more friendly over time. The two were immediately tasked with solving a murder case with similarities to the Black Dahlia murder. After solving the case, Galloway and Phelps received several similar cases, which appeared to be committed by the Black Dahlia's killer, but ultimately led to other suspects being arrested through strong evidence. With strong cases and convictions, Galloway dismissed the similarities between the murders, refusing to admit a connection. However, when clues were discovered connecting the crimes, Phelps and Galloway discovered that all of the murders were connected, and eventually track down and kill the real murderer, unbeknownst to the public. Phelps was then promoted to the Vice department, and Galloway was eventually partnered with Stefan Bekowsky.

McGrady was impressed by the amount of detail and research put into the game, as well as the way in which Galloway's character was written, which convinced him to play the role after reading the script. McGrady said his own introverted personality helped him connect to the character. "I am a classic introvert but I can hold court when I need to. I think Rusty is that way too," he said.

Roy Earle 
Roy Earle (Adam J. Harrington) is the partner of Cole Phelps while on the Administrative Vice Desk. Earle played a part in Phelps's promotion to the Vice department, having realised his growing fame and success. The two investigated several cases regarding morphine distribution in Los Angeles, as well as busting a marijuana distribution ring and a prize fight racket. Earle was involved in a scandal with the rest of the Vice department, which threatened to ruin the current administration if it became public. Earle approached other superior officers involved in the scandal with a story to distract the press—Phelps's affair with Elsa Lichtmann—in exchange for being part of the syndicate. This ultimately led to Phelps's demotion to the Arson department. Phelps, along with Jack Kelso, continued to investigate the syndicate, putting the administration at risk. However, Phelps's death prior to any evidence going public allowed Earle to conceal his corruption and involvement with the syndicate.

Harrington described Roy as "jaded, tough, mean, cruel, brutally honest and ... very funny". Both Harrington and McNamara felt that Roy was "one of the truest characters to the genre"; his actions and opinions, including his racist and misogynistic attitudes and sense of entitlement, were reflective of those in the time period. Harrington took credit for all of Roy's facial expressions, but said that all of the dialogue was scripted, as opposed to ad-lib. Harrington felt that the motion capture performances felt akin to a live performance, whereas the MotionScan process felt "a little restricting".

Herschel Biggs 

Herschel Biggs (Keith Szarabajka) is the partner of Cole Phelps while on the Arson Desk. Like Phelps, Biggs is a former Marine as well, having served during World War I. Biggs was partnered with Phelps following his demotion from Vice to Arson. Initially unfriendly towards Phelps, due to his distaste for partners, Biggs showed him little sympathy due to his affair. While investigating house fires, Phelps suspected that the fires were connected, which Biggs dismissed as weak attempts to restore his personal glory. Biggs became visibly distraught while investigating another house fire, which he attributed to his experience during the Battle of Belleau Wood in which a barn that his unit was trapped in was destroyed. After investigating a housing development that burned down, Biggs and Phelps began to suspect a connection between the arson and Elysian Fields Development. After questioning Leland Monroe, Biggs and Phelps were threatened (by Captain McKelty and Roy Earle, respectively) to stop them from investigating Monroe's affairs, and they decided to close the case. The two began to work more cooperatively, and trust each other.

Their investigation was then halted due to the corruption and Monroe's influences, but Jack Kelso helped them discover more evidence of the conspiracy behind Monroe and the Suburban Redevelopment Fund. When Biggs and Phelps were investigating the murder of Harlan Fontaine, they discovered that the Suburban Redevelopment Fund was committing extortion through eminent domain. They arrived at the river tunnels to help Kelso save Elsa and apprehend the arsonist behind the fires, Ira Hogeboom. Biggs pulled Kelso and Elsa safely out of the tunnel, but Phelps was killed by a violent torrent of water. At Phelps's funeral, Biggs tells Kelso that the latter was "never [Phelps's] friend", though admitted that he was "never his enemy".

Elsa Lichtmann 

Elsa Lichtmann (Erika Heynatz) is a German singer at The Blue Room nightclub. Lichtmann first met Phelps after his promotion from Traffic, after which he developed an interest in her and frequently visited the club to watch her perform. When Elsa becomes a witness in an investigation, Phelps tails her to her hotel, and the two begin an affair. This ultimately leads to Phelps's demotion, and his interest in the LAPD's corruption. Elsa seeks help from Jack Kelso, who uncovers more information regarding the corruption, and the syndicate of the Suburban Redevelopment Fund. When Elsa confronted psychiatrist Harlan Fontaine about the syndicate, due to his involvement, he attacked her; she was rescued by the intervention of Ira Hogeboom, who took her to the river tunnels and protected her. Phelps and Kelso soon take her from the tunnels, but the former is killed by a violent torrent of water. At Phelps's funeral, Roy Earle claims that the accusations against Phelps of an affair with Elsa were false, which causes her to walk out in a fit of sorrow and rage.

Heynatz described the MotionScan process as "other-worldly". Elsa's musical performances were played by German singer Claudia Brücken.

Leland Monroe 

Leland Monroe (John Noble) is the founder and CEO of Elysian Fields Development, and played a large role in the creation of the Suburban Redevelopment Fund, an organisation of private investors to develop houses for returning servicemen in Los Angeles. While he had a strong investment in the organisation, he developed a plan to extort millions of dollars from the government: to build fraudulent, and thereby cheap, houses along the path of the new freeway, which the government would then purchase as eminent domain, repaying Monroe and the investors. Gaining the support of several high-ranking figures of the city, Monroe effectively turned the Suburban Redevelopment Fund into a criminal syndicate. While Monroe bought out several estates, he faced the predicament of some holdouts; as a solution, Monroe and Harlan Fontaine ordered Ira Hogeboom to burn down the houses, allowing Monroe to acquire the states.

When Arson detectives Cole Phelps and Herschel Biggs suspected Monroe's involvement in the house fires, they questioned him; Monroe denied all allegations. Meanwhile, private investigator Jack Kelso also became close to discovering the truth of the Suburban Redevelopment Fund, and Monroe personally phoned him to offer a settlement. Suspecting a trap, Kelso fought his way through Monroe's protection and raided his mansion, discovering evidence in his office such as the payroll of corrupt figures, Fontaine's criminal report, and the list of holdouts. Kelso shot Monroe in the leg and left him to bleed to death. He managed to survive, and it is suggested that he was later sent to prison.

McNamara contacted Noble early in development, in about 2005. Throughout development, Noble regularly visited the studio and performed tests with the MotionScan technology. The team eventually approached him for a role in the game, which he accepted the role due to the advancement of the technology, as well as his fondness for McNamara. Noble eventually began performing in early 2010. He described Monroe as "such a different character" than his usual roles.

Harlan Fontaine 

Harlan J. Fontaine (Peter Blomquist) is a clinical psychiatrist in Los Angeles. Following one of his psychology lectures, Fontaine met former Marine Courtney Sheldon, and offered him a part-time job at one of his clinics. The two formed a close mentor–student relationship, and Sheldon eventually turned to Fontaine in a moment of crisis: Sheldon and his fellow Marines had stolen army surplus morphine following the end of the war, and had reached a predicament regarding the distribution of the morphine. Fontaine made a deal to take the morphine, promising to distribute it legally to medical facilities, in return reinvesting the money into building houses for returning G.I.s; in actuality, Fontaine discreetly sold the morphine to addicts. He used the profits to invest in the Suburban Redevelopment Fund, becoming part of a criminal syndicate to extort millions of dollars through insurance claims. When Sheldon confronted Fontaine after discovering evidence of the Suburban Redevelopment Fund, Fontaine killed him. He was later confronted by Elsa Lichtmann, one of his patients, about the same thing. As he prepared to kill Elsa, Ira Hogeboom arrived and killed Fontaine.

Courtney Sheldon 
Courtney Sheldon (Chad Todhunter) is a former Navy Corpsman, serving with the United States Navy and Marine Corps. As his unit was returning on the SS Coolridge to the United States after the war, Sheldon suggested that they steal the ship's cargo of surplus morphine, and sell it upon their return. After doing so, the drug trafficking operation resulted in the death of addicts; Sheldon tried to halt the operation, to the displeasure of gangster Mickey Cohen and his organisation. Sheldon sought assistance from psychiatrist Harlan Fontaine, with whom he had developed a close relationship. Fontaine agreed to take the morphine and distribute it to medical facilities; in actuality, the morphine was sold on the streets, and the profits were used in the Suburban Redevelopment Fund, a syndicate set up to extort millions of dollars through insurance claims. When Sheldon confronted Fontaine after discovering evidence of the syndicate, Fontaine killed him.

Mickey Cohen 

Mickey Cohen (Patrick Fischler) is a gangster, and a member of the Jewish Mafia. Friendly with many other members of the Vice squad, Cohen encountered Phelps on a number of cases, accompanied by his bodyguard Johnny Stompanato. Cohen is in control of prostitution, illegal gambling, racketeering, narcotic distribution and several murders. He offered to purchase stolen morphine from Courtney Sheldon; when Sheldon refused, Cohen ordered the death of him and the rest of his military unit.

In L.A. Noire, Cohen is the fictional version of gangster Mickey Cohen (1913–1976), who was involved in similar situations as depicted in the game. Fischler described the experience as "a real thrill", particularly due to Cohen's real reputation, and Fischler's recurring interest in the gangster genre.

James Donnelly 
James Donnelly (Andrew Connolly) is the captain of the LAPD Homicide Department. He first met Phelps during a murder investigation on the Patrol desk; Donnelly was impressed by his initiative, and requested Phelps's promotion to Detective. When Phelps was promoted to the Homicide department, Donnelly partnered him with Rusty Galloway. He briefed Phelps and Galloway during their time on the department, assisting in many of their later cases. When Phelps was charged with adultery, Donnelly expressed his disappointment.

Captain Donnelly is loosely based on both LAPD Captain Jack Donahue, as well as Brendan McNamara's father.

Reception 
The characters received positive responses. Justin McElroy of Joystiq found that the characters and the script combined to place L.A. Noire among the "most compelling video game stories ever". Giant Bomb's Brad Shoemaker praised the juxtaposition between Phelps and the "atmosphere of corruption, paranoia, and opportunism". Mikel Reparaz of GamesRadar felt that Phelps is initially "a robotic douche", but becomes more likable as the game progresses. Kotaku's Stephen Totilo was fascinated by the depth of the characters, particularly by how little was known about Phelps by the story's end. Steve Boxer of The Guardian stated that the events in Phelps's life increased the game's immersion. Oli Welsh of Eurogamer wrote that, although the game's plot helps with "bringing the characters to life", characters such as Phelps felt "dry".

The character performances also received praise. Edge praised Staton's "solid" performance, but wrote that the supporting cast—such as Connelly's performance as Captain Donnelly—"stands out". IGN's Hilary Goldstein commended all elements of the performances, including the mannerisms and expressions of the actors. Game Informers Matt Helgeson described the voice acting as "high quality" and "superb". Giant Bomb's Shoemaker wrote that the performances "range from good to stellar". IGN's Anthony Gallegos wrote that the performances evoke genuine empathy and emotion, and command the attention of the player. Some of the actors were awarded for their performances: Staton received nominations from the British Academy Video Games Awards and The Daily Telegraph.

References 

Characters
Lists of Rockstar Games characters